Emily Valentine Bullock is a New Zealand artist based in Sydney, Australia. Her work is in the permanent collection of Sarjeant Gallery in Whanganui, New Zealand.

Biography 
Bullock graduated from Sydney College of the Arts in 1987 with a bachelor of visual arts, majoring in jewellery. She specialises in creating objects using, or decorated with, bird feathers. She also uses taxidermy to make pieces of wearable art, such as a bra made from her deceased pet budgerigars, which won the 2002 Bizarre Bra section in the World of Wearable Art Awards. In 2015, her entry 'Sulphur Crested Frockatoo' was awarded the WOW Factor Award at the same event, judged by Dame Suzie Moncrieff.

References

External links 

 Official website

Living people
Year of birth missing (living people)
21st-century New Zealand artists
New Zealand emigrants to Australia